Jordan Alexander Walker (born May 22, 2002) is an American professional baseball outfielder and third baseman in the St. Louis Cardinals organization. Walker was selected 21st overall by the Cardinals in the 2020 Major League Baseball draft.

Amateur career
Walker attended Decatur High School where he played baseball. In 2019, his junior year, he batted .519 with 17 home runs, 60 runs batted in (RBIs), and 24 stolen bases. As a senior in 2020, he hit .457 with four home runs and 15 RBIs over 16 games before the season was cut short due to the COVID-19 pandemic, and was selected as the Georgia Gatorade Player of the Year. He committed to play college baseball at Duke University.

Professional career
Walker was selected 21st overall by the St. Louis Cardinals in the first round of the 2020 Major League Baseball draft. On June 23, Walker signed with the Cardinals for a $2.9 million bonus. He did not play a minor league game in 2020 due to the cancellation of the minor league season caused by the pandemic.

To begin the 2021 season, Walker was assigned to the Palm Beach Cardinals of the Low-A Southeast. He homered on the first pitch of his first professional at-bat. On May 28, he was placed on the injured list, and was activated on June 12. He was promoted to the Peoria Chiefs of the High-A Central in late June. Over 82 games between the two clubs, Walker slashed .317/.388/.548 with 14 home runs, 48 RBIs, 25 doubles, and 14 stolen bases. The Cardinals named him their Minor League Co-Player of the Year alongside Juan Yepez.

Walker was assigned to the Springfield Cardinals of the Double-A Texas League for the 2022 season. He was selected to represent the Cardinals alongside Masyn Winn at the 2022 All-Star Futures Game. In early August, he began playing in the outfield after being a third baseman throughout his career. Over 119 games with Springfield, he compiled a .306/.388/.510 slash line with 19 home runs, 58 RBIs, 31 doubles, and 22 stolen bases. He was selected to play in the Arizona Fall League for the Salt River Rafters after the season.

References

External links

2002 births
Living people
Baseball players from Georgia (U.S. state)
People from Stone Mountain, Georgia
Baseball third basemen
Palm Beach Cardinals players
Peoria Chiefs players
Springfield Cardinals players